Virginia Falls is a waterfall in Nahanni National Park Reserve, Northwest Territories, Canada.

An American adventurer and businessman from Long Island, New York named Fenley Hunter, under the employ of the Geological Survey of Canada, explored the region during the summer of 1928 and named the waterfall after his daughter.

The rock in the centre of the falls is called Mason's Rock, named after Bill Mason, a Canadian canoeist, author, and filmmaker.

The Virginia Falls Water Aerodrome is close by.

Gallery

See also
List of waterfalls by flow rate
List of waterfalls of the Northwest Territories

References 

Landforms of the Northwest Territories
Waterfalls of Canada
Nahanni National Park Reserve